Ranau is the capital of the Ranau District in the West Coast Division of Sabah, Malaysia. Its population was estimated to be around 8,970 in 2010.

Climate
Ranau has a tropical rainforest climate (Af) with heavy rainfall year-round.

References

External links 

Ranau District
Towns in Sabah